The Williford Methodist Church is a historic church at the northwest corner of Ferguson and Hail Streets in the middle of Williford, Arkansas.  It is a single-story wood-frame structure, with a gable roof and stone foundation.  It has Gothic Revival pointed-arch windows and a small belfry with a pyramidal roof.  The interior contains original pews and pulpit.  Built c. 1910, the building is locally notable for its distinctive vernacular Gothic Revival architecture, and as the first purpose-built church building in the community.

The building was listed on the National Register of Historic Places in 1992.

See also
National Register of Historic Places listings in Sharp County, Arkansas

References

Methodist churches in Arkansas
Churches on the National Register of Historic Places in Arkansas
Carpenter Gothic church buildings in Arkansas
Churches completed in 1910
Buildings and structures in Sharp County, Arkansas
National Register of Historic Places in Sharp County, Arkansas